Zénon Labauve Jr. (February 16, 1801September 25, 1870) was a Reconstruction-era justice of the Louisiana Supreme Court and the first Creole to serve on the court.

Labauve was born in 1801 in a portion of West Florida that would later become West Baton Rouge Parish, Louisiana. His father, Pierre Labauve, was a Louisiana Creole born in St. James Parish and his mother was a native of France. He first won election to the Louisiana State Senate in 1834, but was defeated for reelection in 1838. In 1838, he was elected the first mayor of the newly incorporated Plaquemine. In July 1842 he was again elected to the state Senate as a Whig, but the election results were cancelled. When the election was re-run in 1843, he was again successful. In 1844, he was elected to the state's Constitutional Convention of 1845. In a brief biographical sketch of Constitutional Convention delegates, The Times-Picayune newspaper noted "His speeches are generally brief, but give evidence of a sound thinker." Despite desiring to retire from the state Senate, he was nominated once more and in 1851 reelected without opposition.

After the Civil War, Labauve was appointed by the Reconstruction-era governor Michael Hahn to an associate justice seat on the Louisiana Supreme Court. Labauve served from April 3, 1865, to November 1, 1868. Prior to his appointment, Labauve had grown wealthy as a sugar planter and lawyer in the German Coast. He and his fellow appointees were considered "safe" and "loyal" and in alignment with the Federal government. Labauve was the "[f]irst member of 'ancienne populacion'," meaning he was descended from a Creole family that was in Louisiana prior to the Sale of Louisiana, to serve on the Louisiana Supreme Court.

He died in 1870 in Iberville Parish.

References

1801 births
1870 deaths
People from West Baton Rouge Parish, Louisiana
Justices of the Louisiana Supreme Court
Louisiana state senators
19th-century American politicians
19th-century American judges
People of Colonial Spanish Louisiana